Prowse Point Military Cemetery is a Commonwealth War Graves Commission (CWGC) burial ground for the dead of the First World War located in the Ypres Salient on the Western Front in Belgium.

The cemetery grounds were assigned to the United Kingdom in perpetuity by King Albert I of Belgium in recognition of the sacrifices made by the British Empire in the defence and liberation of Belgium during the war.

Foundation
The cemetery is on the site of a stand made by the 1st Battalions of the Hampshire Regiment and Somerset Light Infantry in October 1914. Major (later Brigadier-General) Charles Bertie Prowse displayed heroism at this stand and the site (and thus cemetery) was named after him. This makes the cemetery unique on the Salient for being named after an individual.

The cemetery was begun in November 1914 and continued to be used until fighting moved beyond the Ploegsteert area in April 1918.

The cemetery was designed by W H Cowlishaw.

Notable graves include Sergeant W A Connor of the Royal Berkshire Regiment, who was awarded the French Croix de Guerre.

Later burials

This site featured heavy fighting at numerous points in the war. As such, remains of combatants are still occasionally being discovered in the area. Private Harry Wilkinson of the Lancashire Fusiliers was originally listed on the Ploegsteert Memorial to the Missing but his body was recovered and buried here in 2001.

More recently, the remains of Private Richard Lancaster of the Lancashire Fusiliers, plus two others unidentified, were found and were buried at Prowse Point with full military honours. The ceremony was attended by his granddaughter.

References

External links
 
 

Commonwealth War Graves Commission cemeteries in Belgium